Jacob Needham & The Blue Trees is an American musical quartet originating from Birmingham, Alabama. The band was formed in 2015 by lead vocalist Jacob Needham along with guitarist and music producer James Tyler Cody. After recording a full-length unreleased demo album, James and Jacob recruited bassist Ben Trexel and drummer RaShaun Whetstone to round out the quartet. From 2016 to 2017, The Blue Trees performed in multiple states and began recording a debut album in Nashville, TN at Sound Kitchen Studios. One of the early tracks for the album, “Alabama Baby”, was included on a compilation album which was sent to the Spectra Music Group. By this point, the band had completed the album and the label released it as it was. The album, Procrastinated Memoirs, was officially released on April 6, 2018.

The band’s sound is self-described as Southern Americana Groove Rock. Before the release of Procrastinated Memoirs, the band released three singles, “Chasing You”, “All But Over Now”, and “Take Me Away”. “Chasing You” charted at #8 on the Adult Contemporary radio charts in late 2015.

History 
Jacob Needham met James Tyler Cody in March 2015 after Cody responded to an online musician classified. At the time, Needham had just released his first solo single “Forever Girl,” and was looking to find some collaborators closer to home. The two composed the song “Draw Me In,” within their first fifteen minutes of meeting. Things moved quickly on the creative front and the two had a complete demo album written and produced within 5 months. It was at this point that Cody reached out to colleague Ben Trexel, also a Birmingham area music producer and guitarist to help mix the project. Coincidentally, Trexel grew up with and was best friends with Jacob’s Aunt. Shortly into the mixing process, it became obvious that the three shared a musical bond and Trexel joined as a full member in September 2015.  The urge for the band was to get an album out and it would have been easy to release the first set of songs the band wrote. However, creativity seemed to get in the way and when drummer Rashaun Whetstone joined in 2016, the band entered into a burst of creative productivity that ultimately yielded the songs that appear on Procrastinated Memoirs.

The process helped define the band’s strengths and the overall vibe and sound the band aspired to have. The band feels that the extreme diversity of all the band members’ influences plays a huge role in the uniqueness of the band’s sound. While lead vocalist/lyricist Jacob Needham’s main influences as a child were country music and rap, genres where the lyrics are of ultimate importance, bassist Ben Trexel was weaned on Led Zeppelin and Pink Floyd, guitarist James Cody on Guns N' Roses and Metallica, and drummer Rashaun Whetstone on groove-oriented world music, including that of artists such as Richard Bona and Amadou Mariam. In 2019 Bassist Christopher Bevacqua joined the group replacing Trexel.

Discography 
 Chasing You (single) (2015)
 All But Over Now (single) (2016)
 Take Me Away (single) (compilation, 2018)
 Procrastinated Memoirs (album) (2018)

Further reading 
 https://indiepulsemusic.com/2018/05/10/jacob-needham-the-blue-trees-southern-americana-groove-rock/
 http://ventsmagazine.com/2018/01/25/interview-southern-americana-groove-rock-band-jacob-needham-blue-trees/
 https://www.pnj.com/story/entertainment/events/gopensacola/music/2017/08/18/music-video-shooting-tuesday-flora-bama/580022001/

External links 

 https://www.bluetreenation.com/

2015 establishments in Alabama
Musical groups established in 2015
Musical groups from Birmingham, Alabama
Rock music groups from Alabama